Futbol Club Barcelona is a professional association football club based in Barcelona, Catalonia, Spain. The club was founded in 1899 by a group of Swiss, English and Spanish men led by Joan Gamper. Barcelona is one of only three clubs to have never been relegated from La Liga and the most successful club in Spanish football, having won a total of 76 domestic titles: 26 La Liga titles, a record 31 Spanish Cups, 14 Spanish Super Cups, a record 3 Copas Eva Duarte and a record 2 League Cups. Barcelona is the only European side to have played continental football in every season since its inception in 1955 and one of the most successful clubs in European football, having won 14 official UEFA trophies in total.

Aside from being the founder, Gamper was also one of the club's first footballers and holds the record for most goals in a single match, with nine. Lionel Messi holds the record for the most number of appearances in official matches with 778, is the all-time top scorer with 700+ goals, all-time top scorer in official competitions, with 672, is the current La Liga top scorer with 474 goals and holds the record for the most appearances in La Liga, with 520  matches. Messi has won the record number of trophies for the club (35).

Barcelona has employed several famous players, with five FIFA World Player of the Year winners and six Ballon d'Or winners among the previous and current Barcelona players. This makes Barça the club with the most FIFA World Player awards received by the players. In 2009, Barcelona achieved an unprecedented sextuple by winning La Liga, the Copa del Rey, the UEFA Champions League, the Supercopa de España, the UEFA Super Cup and the FIFA Club World Cup in one calendar year. The same year, five of their players and their coach were voted onto the UEFA Team of the Year.

The list includes notable footballers who have played for Barcelona. Generally, this means players that have played at least 100 league matches for the club. However, some players who have played fewer matches are also included if they are on Barcelona's list of legends. Between 1899 and May 2015, 958 footballers have played at least one official game with Barcelona.

Key

List of players 

Appearance and goal totals only include matches in La Liga, which was first established in 1928; players who were only active before then are included for their notability. Substitute appearances are included.
Statistics are correct as of 8 November 2022.

Club captains

Notes 
NB For a full description of positions see football positions.
d'Or.  Won Ballon d'Or while at Barcelona.
BEST.  Won The Best FIFA Men's Player while at Barcelona.
FIFA.  Won FIFA Player of the Year while at Barcelona.
Pichichi. Won the Pichichi Trophy, a trophy for top goalscorer in the league, while at Barcelona. Martín was the first Barcelona player to win the trophy.
Zamora. Won the Zamora Trophy, a trophy for goalkeeper who has the lowest "goals-to-games" ratio in the league, while at Barcelona.
A.  Gamper is record goalscorer in one match, with nine goals. 
B.  Samitier is Barcelona's record goalscorer in the Spanish Cup.
C.  Ramallets along with Valdés has Barcelona's record of Zamora trophies, with five trophies won.
D.  Suárez was the first Barcelona player to win the Ballon d'Or in 1960.
E.  Romário was the first Barcelona player to win the FIFA World Player of the Year award, in 1994.
F.  Xavi has made the most appearances for Barcelona with 178 matches in international competitions games.
G.  Messi has won the most titles with Barcelona, with 35; 10 La Liga, 7 Copas del Rey, 4 Champions League, 8 Supercopas de España, 3 UEFA Super Cups and 3 FIFA Club World Cups
H.  Puyol captained Barcelona to the first ever sextuple.
I.  Messi is Barcelona's record goalscorer in all competitions including friendlies with 709 goals.
J.  Messi is Barcelona's record goalscorer in official competitions with 672 goals.
K.  Messi is Barcelona's record goalscorer in La Liga with 474 goals.
L.  Messi is Barcelona's record goalscorer league goals in one season, with 50 goals in a 38-game league during the 2011–12 season. 
M.  Messi is Barcelona's record goalscorer most goals in one season with 73 goals in official competitions during the 2011–12 season. 
N.  Messi is Barcelona's record goalscorer most goals in international competitions for Barcelona with 128.
O.  Messi holds the record of appearances for Barcelona as a foreign player, with 520 La Liga appearances.
P.  Pedro and Messi are the only players to score in six official competitions in a year. They scored in the La Liga, Spanish Cup, Spanish Supercup, UEFA Champions League, UEFA Super Cup and FIFA Club World Cup in 2009 (Pedro) and 2011 (Messi).
Q.  Pedro scored the fastest league hat-trick in Barcelona's history: 9 minutes (34th, 41st, 43rd), against Getafe in 2013–14.
R.  Coutinho transferred from Liverpool to Barcelona in the winter of 2018, with Barcelona's joint highest transfer fee of €105 million.
S.  Griezmann transferred from Atlético Madrid to Barcelona in the summer of 2019, with Barcelona's joint highest transfer fee of €105 million.
T.  Lionel Messi has made the most league appearances for Barcelona with 520   games.
U.  Messi has made the most appearances for Barcelona with 778 games in all competitions.

See also 
List of Catalan footballers

References 
General
All player information can be found on the official La Liga homepage, which list player data for each completed season:

Statistics from the latest season page found here:

 Gran diccionari dels jugadors del Barça, Editarial Base, 2015.

Specific

External links 
 FC Barcelona players in La Liga at BDFutbol

Barcelona
 
Players
Association football player non-biographical articles